The following is a list of UNLV Runnin' Rebels men's basketball head coaches at the University of Nevada Las Vegas in Las Vegas, Nevada. The UNLV Runnin' Rebels men's basketball program has been led by 16 head coaches in their history. 14 of the 16 coaches have winning records at UNLV.

Jerry Tarkanian led UNLV to the NCAA Division I Tournament Championship in 1990  and the NCAA Division I Men's Final Four in 1977, 1987, 1990 and 1991.

Jerry Tarkanian was inducted into the Naismith Basketball Hall of Fame. Rollie Massimino was inducted into the College Basketball Hall of Fame.

References

UNLV Runnin' Rebels
UNLV Runnin' Rebels basketball, men's, coaches